Hildburghausen is a town in Thuringia in central Germany, capital of the district Hildburghausen.

Geography
It is situated in the Franconian part of Thuringia south of the Thuringian Forest, in the valley of the Werra river.

History

The settlement of Hilteburgehusin was first mentioned in a 1234 deed, when the Counts of Henneberg sold it to the Prince-Bishops of Würzburg. Repurchased in 1316, the Henneberg lords vested the citizens with town privileges in 1324 and had city walls erected. In 1353 the estates of Hildburghausen were inherited by the Wettin landgrave Frederick III of Thuringia and upon the 1485 Treaty of Leipzig became part of the Ernestine duchies.

In 1528 the Hildburghausen citizens turned Protestant. The town fell to the newly established Duchy of Saxe-Coburg in 1572 and upon the extinction of the line in 1638 passed to the Duchy of Saxe-Altenburg. In 1680 it became the residence of the Ernestine dukes of Saxe-Hildburghausen until its dissolution in 1826, after which it passed to the Duchy of Saxe-Meiningen. The town became part of the new state of Thuringia in 1920.

Notable people
 
 
Karoline von Feuchtersleben (17741842) born in Hildburghausen
Friedrich Dotzauer (1783–1860)
Princess Charlotte of Saxe-Hildburghausen (1787–1847)
Princess Louise of Saxe-Hildburghausen (1794–1825)
Joseph Meyer (publisher) (1796–1856)
Marie of Saxe-Altenburg (1818–1907)
Hans Meyer (geologist) (1858–1929)
Ronald Weigel (b. 1959) in Hildburghausen

References

External links

Hildburghausen (district)
Duchy of Saxe-Meiningen